Klari Station (KLI) is a class III railway station located in Anggadita, Klari, Karawang Regency. The station, which is located at an altitude of +23 meters, is included in the Operation Area I Jakarta.

At the station a cement warehouse was also built to serve the loading and unloading of the Bima cement train from the Kretek Station which began operating on 2 November 2015.

Services
The following is a list of train services at the Klari Station.

Passenger services 
 Jatiluhur Express, to 

Freight services 
 Bima cement (PT STAR), to

References

External links
 

karawang Regency
Railway stations in West Java
railway stations opened in 1902
1902 establishments in the Dutch East Indies